Robert Stuart Redfield (1849–1923) was an American photographer from Philadelphia involved in pictorialism. He was a president of the Photographic Society of Philadelphia and a founding member of the Photo-Secession movement. Redfield was born in New York City on May 2, 1849, the third child of Mary Jane and John Howard Redfield. He married Mary Thibault Guillou, and with her had four children, including the mathematician J. Howard Redfield and the naturalist Alfred C. Redfield.

References

External links

1849 births
1923 deaths
Pictorialists
19th-century American photographers
Photographers from Philadelphia